Cosman Citroen (26 August 1881 – 15 May 1935) was a Dutch architect. He designed buildings in the Dutch East Indies including the headquarters of the Dutch East Indies Railway Company.

Early life
Citroen was the son of Levie Citroen (born on November 12, 1855), a diamond cutter in Amsterdam, and Sara Levie Coltof (born on February 26, 1852). The family included six children.

Career

Citroen took an architectural education at the State Normal School in Amsterdam and obtained his degree for teacher MO engineering. For the next thirteen years (1902 to 1915) he worked in the architectural firm of J.F. Klinkhamer and B.J. Ouëndag.

In 1907, he helped design of the NIS headquarters and worked as the company's bureau chief. In 1915 he left to move to the Dutch East Indies. In 1916, he made the first plans for a new town hall and designed the building for the Darmo Hospital. He was a member of several committees, such as the construction restrictions commission and the Archaeological Advisory Service. He was also president of the Museum of Antiquities Association in Surabaya and, during the last years of his life, as architectural advisor to the city of Surabaya. He worked on the urban plan for the area's expansion including the town plan for Ketabang.

In his role as an architect, he was commissioned a plan for the renovation of the old society Concordia for British Petroleum Company. Other buildings which were designed Citroen house on Sumatra Street (later the American consulate), housing in Lawang, the street plan for Koepang, and an overpass on the Pasar Besar. He died after an operation at the age of 53 years from heart failure. The burial took place in Kembang Kuning.

See also
Colonial architecture of Surabaya
Colonial architecture of Indonesia

References

Sources
 'Architect C. Citroen deceased "in the Algemeen Handelsblad, May 17, 1935
 C. Lemon. His career ', in the Indian Gazette, May 16, 1935

Further reading
A study of architect Cosman Citroen (1881-1935) and his works in Surabaya Doctoral Thesis

1881 births
1935 deaths
20th-century Dutch architects
Architects from Amsterdam
Dutch people of the Dutch East Indies
Architects in the Dutch East Indies